refers to two anime series co-produced by Production I.G and Cartoon Network. The first is a "microseries" consisting of five 5-minute episodes, and the second is a 26-episode animated series loosely related to the first.

Koichi Mashimo co-wrote and directed the microseries, while Bee Train and Production I.G animated it, and Bandai Entertainment acted as the North American distributor. The full-length anime series was handled by director and writer Mitsuru Hongo and was animated by Production I.G, with Bee Train returning for in-between animation. Production I.G president Mitsuhisa Ishikawa joined on as producer for the series. It was the first time he had worked on a joint U.S. Japanese production, due to the Pokémon companion franchise.

The series' English dub was produced by Williams Street in Atlanta, Georgia and Bang Zoom! Entertainment in Burbank, California. Both studios collaborated on the English script and casting, Bang Zoom directed and recorded the actors, and Williams Street handled the final mixing for the dub. IGPX was the first ever Toonami original anime series.

An IGPX video game was released on September 12, 2006, for the PlayStation 2.

The program returned to the Toonami block on April 28, 2013, at 2 a.m. ET on Adult Swim. On November 21, 2014, anime distributor Discotek Media announced their license to the TV series and re-released both cuts (including Toonami cut and Production I.G cut) of the series on DVD on February 9, 2016.

IGPX microseries 
The Immortal Grand Prix is a tournament between teams of gun-wielding mechs. As Team Velshtein is injured, the random drawing chooses Team Suzaku, led by pilot Takeshi Noa, as the one to face Team Sledge Mamma, a trio of cybernetically enhanced cyborgs. At first, Team Suzaku does not have weapons because their mechanic U-Matsu forgot them. Amy delivers weapons from Velshtein, but Team Suzaku has a hard time controlling them. Amy's cat co-pilot Luca takes control and knocks Timmer out of his mech. Liz, out of ammo, uses her capoeira image training. She is eventually at the mercy of an opposing pilot and surrenders. The Sledge Mamma mechs shoot at Takeshi, but Amy jumps in to save him and is knocked out of the game. After being kicked around by the Sledge Mamma mechs, Takeshi reveals his plan. Using his ninjatō and shuriken, he knocks Dimmer and Yammer out of their mechs and wins. However, the series ends on a bitter note as Velshtein's owner Hamgra blackmails Team Suzaku to merge their teams and allow him to add cybernetic enhancements to their pilots, or else he will make them pay for the weapons they borrowed. This conflict is never resolved due to the end of the microseries.

Cast 
 Beau Billingslea – Yammer
 Steven Blum – Cunningham
 Sandy Fox – Amy
 Steve Kramer – Timmer
 Lex Lang – Metoo
 Wendee Lee – BT
 Julie Maddalena – Luca
 Michael McConnohie – Dimmer
 Jamieson Price – Hamgra
 Michelle Ruff – Suzaku
 Joshua Seth – Takeshi Noa
 Julie Ann Taylor – PA
 Kirk Thornton – Umatsu
 Kari Wahlgren –  Liz

IGPX TV series 

The IGPX TV series made its hour-long premiere on November 5, 2005, at 10/9c. The series is set in 2049 and revolves around the Immortal Grand Prix, or IGPX, which is a mecha racing/battle circuit. The sport is so popular that an entire city has been built for the racing industry, where competitions take place on a huge  track. The IGPX also contains fighting elements; attacking the opposing team to disable their mechs (thus preventing them from winning the race) is not only legal, but also expected. Team Satomi, a crew of amateur pilots, has just won a minor-league championship, the IG-2, vaulting them into the sport's highest level, the IG-1. Now, the untested rookies of Team Satomi must overcome impossible odds and beat the world's most skilled and ruthless pilots.

The series was Toonami's first original series.

Cast 
 Haley Joel Osment – Takeshi Jin
 Michelle Rodriguez – Liz Riccaro
 Steven Blum – Alex Cunningham
 Louise Chamis – Jane Rublev
 Peter Cullen – Opening Narration
  Erik Davies – Ricardo Montazio
 Doug Erholtz – Zanak Strauss
 Michael Forest – Hans
 Crispin Freeman – Bjorn Johassen
 Barbara Goodson – Misaki
 Mark Hamill – Yamma
 Lance Henriksen – Andrei Rublev
 Kate Higgins – Jessica Darling
 Megan Hollingshead – Judy Ballasteros
 Tom Kenny – Benjamin Bright
 William Frederick Knight – Ichi
 Lex Lang – Dew
 Mela Lee – Max Erlich
 Wendee Lee – Sola
 Julie Maddalena – Jesse Martin
 Dave Mallow – Glass Jones, MC
 Tony Oliver – Edgeraid Coach
 Michelle Ruff – Elisa Doolittle
 Stephanie Sheh – Bella Demarco, Yuri Jin
 Brianne Siddall – Johnny Lipkin
 Steve Staley – River Marque
 Karen Strassman – Fantine Valjean
 Kim Strauss – Sir Hamgra
 Julie Ann Taylor – Boy A
 Kirk Thornton – Mark Ramsay
 Cristina Vee – Sage Rublev
 Kari Wahlgren – Luca, Michiru Satomi
 Hynden Walch – Amy Stapleton
 Andre Ware – Dimma
 Dave Wittenberg – Frank Bullitt, Jan Michael, Timma

IGPX promotions 
A promotional DVD featuring the Comic-Con early cut of episode 1 ("Time to Shine"), the IGPX trailer, music, and a screensaver was distributed with Anime Insider v. 26 (November 2005) and Nintendo Power v. 198 (December 2005).
Special editions of the U.S. DVD volume 1 release came with a puff pack artbox, a Team Satomi T-shirt, the first episode from the microseries and team stickers, one for each of the teams from season one.

Allusions 
 Fantine Valjean's name is an allusion to the characters Fantine and Jean Valjean in the book Les Misérables by Victor Hugo. Likewise, Team Skylark member Elisa has the same name as the main character of Pygmalion by George Bernard Shaw and as the leading lady in My Fair Lady.
 Andrei Rublev bears the name of a Russian iconographer.
 In the episode "Cat vs. Dog", the owner of Team Edgeraid bears a striking resemblance to Gendo Ikari from Neon Genesis Evangelion. The man also sits with his hands crossed over his face, which was notably done by Gendo and has since been done in many other anime series. This character insertion was probably due to Production I.G working on both IGPX and the Evangelion movies.
 In "Cat vs. Dog", the mecha of Team Edge Raid have GITS painted on their arms. This is a reference to Ghost in the Shell, a franchise animated by Production I.G, who also animated IGPX.  Team Satomi's mechs have the word Absolute painted on their arms, a nod to the "Absolution" spaceship featured in the Toonami commercial bumpers.
 In the final episode of IGPX, Team Black Egg's symbol is shown on the TV located on one of the triple towers that surround the track, which only shows team emblems for IG-1. This suggests that Black Egg has regained their spot in IG-1, replacing Team Skylark after they are demoted to IG-2.
 In the eighth episode of Reideen, a banner titled "Satomi" hangs in the city that Saiga Junki (the main protagonist) lives in. Production I.G's studio created both the IGPX and Reideen anime series. Both series were directed by Mitsuru Hongo.

References

External links 
 Production I.G official English website IGPX page
  Production I.G official Japanese website IGPX page
  Japanese IGPX official website
  TV Asahi's IGPX website
 IGPX: Immortal Grand Prix fan site
 
 
 
 

2003 anime television series debuts
2005 anime television series debuts
Action anime and manga
Anime with original screenplays
Bandai Entertainment anime titles
Bee Train Production
Mecha anime and manga
Fictional motorsports in anime and manga
Production I.G
Shōnen manga
Cartoon Network original programming
Toonami
TV Asahi original programming
Television series by Williams Street
Discotek Media